The nasociliary nerve is a branch of the ophthalmic nerve (CN V1) (which is in turn a branch of the trigeminal nerve (CN V)). It is intermediate in size between the other two branches of the ophthalmic nerve, the frontal nerve and lacrimal nerve.

Structure

Course 
The nasociliary nerve enters the orbit via the superior orbital fissure, through the common tendinous ring, and between the two heads of the lateral rectus muscle and between the superior and inferior rami of the oculomotor nerve. It passes across the optic nerve (CN II) along with the ophthalmic artery. It then runs obliquely beneath (inferior to) the superior rectus muscle and superior oblique muscle to the medial wall of the orbital cavity whereupon it emits the posterior ethmoidal nerve, and the anterior ethmoidal nerve.

Branches 
Branches of the nasociliary nerve include:
 posterior ethmoidal nerve
 anterior ethmoidal nerve
 long ciliary nerves
 infratrochlear nerve
communicating branch to ciliary ganglion

Function

The branches of the nasociliary nerve provide sensory innervation to structures surrounding the eye such as the cornea, eyelids, conjunctiva, ethmoid air cells and mucosa of the nasal cavity.

Clinical significance

Clinical assessment
Since both the short and long ciliary nerves carry the afferent limb of the corneal reflex, one can test the integrity of the nasociliary nerve (and, ultimately, the trigeminal nerve) by examining this reflex in the patient. Normally both eyes should blink when either cornea (not the conjunctiva, which is supplied by the adjacent cutaneous nerves) is irritated. If neither eye blinks, then either the ipsilateral nasociliary nerve is damaged, or the facial nerve (CN VII, which carries the efferent limb of this reflex) is bilaterally damaged. If only the contralateral eye blinks, then the ipsilateral facial nerve is damaged. If only the ipsilateral eye blinks, then the contralateral facial nerve is damaged.

Additional images

References

External links
  - "A deeper dissection of the right orbit from a superior approach."
 
 
 

Ophthalmic nerve
Medical mnemonics